Tenosique is a town located in Tenosique Municipality in the southeastern corner of the state of Tabasco, in Mexico. Its official name is Tenosique de Pino Suárez. The town had a 2020 census population of 34,946 inhabitants (the fourth-largest community in the state after Villahermosa, Cárdenas, and Comalcalco), while the municipality had a population of 62,310.

Tenosique's etymology: from the Maya words "Tana" or house and "tsiic" weaving or counting threads. Which leaves us with "casa de los hilanderos " or "House of Weavers or thread counters". Tenosique was founded c. 1000 B.C. in the Preclassic Maya Period (according to Magnolia Paz Nexo in her book Tenosique Prehispánico y Colonial edited by the Government of Tabasco). Since then Tenosique has been occupied uninterruptedly. Vice President and national hero of the Revolution, José María Pino Suárez  was born in Tenosique in 1869, and the town now bears his name.

Tenosique is on the Usumacinta River, downstream from where the river emerges from the Cañón del Usumacinta onto the plains of Tabasco.

Climate

Notes

References
Link to tables of population data from Census of 2005 INEGI: Instituto Nacional de Estadística, Geografía e Informática
Tabasco Enciclopedia de los Municipios de México

External links

Ayuntamiento de Tenosique Official website

Populated places in Tabasco
Usumacinta River